Dorel Moiş (born 1 July 1975 in Satu Mare, Romania) is a retired Romanian aerobic gymnast. He won three world championship medals (one gold, one silver and one bronze) and one gold European championships medal on the trio event. After retiring from aerobic gymnastics he founded a dance group called Xtreme.

References

External links

1975 births
Living people
Sportspeople from Satu Mare
Romanian aerobic gymnasts
Male aerobic gymnasts
Medalists at the Aerobic Gymnastics World Championships